Adam Schneider (born 12 May 1984) is a former professional Australian rules footballer who played for the Sydney Swans and St Kilda Football Club in the Australian Football League (AFL).

He is currently the assistant coach of the GWS Giants in the Australian Football League (AFL).

Overview
Originally from the small town of Osborne, Schneider spent most of his teenage years at St Francis de Sales Regional College in Leeton before attending Kooringal High School and Trinity Senior High School in Wagga Wagga where he decided to pursue Australian rules football after also excelling in cricket.

AFL career

Sydney Swans
Schneider was recruited from Osborne and NSW/ACT Rams by Sydney in the 2001 AFL Draft. He was Sydney's 4th Round selection and number 60 overall.

During his first season at the club, Schneider suffered minor injuries and illness which sidelined him for over three months.

However, in 2003, Schneider hit the ground running. Through the pre-season and practice matches he was in great form and earned his senior AFL debut. He debuted in round 1 of the 2003 premiership season against Carlton. His form was good enough for him to hold his place in the seniors for all 24 matches as well as kicking 30 goals for the season. He was awarded the AFL Rising Star nomination in round 5 and finished fifth in the voting for that season's award.

2004, however, was a completely different story. Schneider suffered a hamstring injury which saw the young goal sneak sidelined for a month. He managed to be selected for just 12 matches, half as many as the previous season and managed to kick only nine goals.

In the 2005 season, Schneider gradually improved and towards the second half of the season he was again a regular starter. He went on to play for the Swans in the grand final and scored Sydney's second goal of the match, and was an important and variable player.

He was traded to St Kilda in 2007.

St Kilda

Schneider was recruited by St Kilda from Sydney in a trade in exchange for the number 26 draft pick in the 2007 AFL Draft in a deal that also included Sean Dempster moving to the Saints. As at Sydney, Schneider wore the No. 13 guernsey for the Saints.

Schneider played in St Kilda’s 2008 NAB Cup winning side, the club's third pre-season cup win. He then made his premiership debut for the Saints against his old side Sydney, kicking a goal in a two-point victory.

Schneider played in 21 of 22 matches in the 2009 AFL season in which St Kilda qualified in first position for the finals, winning the club’s third minor premiership.

St Kilda qualified for the 2009 AFL Grand Final after qualifying and preliminary finals wins. Schneider played in the grand final in which St Kilda were defeated by 12 points, denying him a second premiership out of three grand final appearances as he had lost a grand final with Sydney in 2006 against  when the Swans lost by one point.

Schneider played in 25 games in 2010, including four finals matches, and kicked 39 goals.

As of the end of the 2010 season, Schneider had played in 22 finals series matches including five grand finals. Following the Grand Final replay, Schneider was suspended for the first two matches of the 2011 season for an incident involving 's Brent Macaffer in the third quarter.

Schneider was de-listed at the conclusion of the 2014 season, and then re-drafted by St Kilda as a mature age rookie for the 2015 AFL season. He played one further season, and retired at the end of 2015 after 228 games, following St Kilda's round 22 home game against his old club, the Sydney Swans.

Post-AFL career

After leaving the AFL, Schneider won a VAFA Premier B premiership with Beaumaris in 2016.

Adam represented Australia at the 2016 Kabbadi World Cup.

Head Coach of GWS Giants in the NEAFL (2019).

Assistant Coach of GWS Giants in the AFL (2020-2021).

Head Coach of The Lavington Panthers Football Club (2022-)

Statistics

|- style="background-color: #EAEAEA"
! scope="row" style="text-align:center" | 2003
|
| 36 || 24 || 30 || 23 || 187 || 75 || 262 || 94 || 38 || 1.3 || 1.0 || 7.8 || 3.1 || 10.9 || 3.9 || 1.6 || 1
|-
! scope="row" style="text-align:center" | 2004
|
| 13 || 12 || 9 || 10 || 71 || 30 || 101 || 28 || 24 || 0.8 || 0.8 || 5.9 || 2.5 || 8.4 || 2.3 || 2.0 || 0
|- style="background:#eaeaea;"
! scope="row" style="text-align:center" | 2005
|
| 13 || 16 || 11 || 10 || 118 || 56 || 174 || 42 || 32 || 0.7 || 0.6 || 7.4 || 3.5 || 10.9 || 2.6 || 2.0 || 0
|-
! scope="row" style="text-align:center" | 2006
|
| 13 || 25 || 22 || 19 || 244 || 116 || 360 || 78 || 74 || 0.9 || 0.8 || 9.8 || 4.6 || 14.4 || 3.1 || 3.0 || 5
|- style="background:#eaeaea;"
! scope="row" style="text-align:center" | 2007
|
| 13 || 21 || 27 || 18 || 211 || 114 || 325 || 98 || 63 || 1.3 || 0.9 || 10.0 || 5.4 || 15.5 || 4.7 || 3.0 || 0
|-
! scope="row" style="text-align:center" | 2008
|
| 13 || 19 || 28 || 17 || 181 || 101 || 282 || 104 || 44 || 1.5 || 0.9 || 9.5 || 5.3 || 14.8 || 5.5 || 2.3 || 1
|- style="background:#eaeaea;"
! scope="row" style="text-align:center" | 2009
|
| 13 || 24 || 34 || 19 || 211 || 130 || 341 || 108 || 114 || 1.4 || 0.8 || 8.8 || 5.4 || 14.2 || 4.5 || 4.8 || 0
|-
! scope="row" style="text-align:center" | 2010
|
| 13 || 25 || 39 || 19 || 268 || 179 || 447 || 120 || 86 || 1.6 || 0.8 || 10.7 || 7.2 || 17.9 || 4.8 || 3.4 || 3
|- style="background:#eaeaea;"
! scope="row" style="text-align:center" | 2011
|
| 13 || 21 || 30 || 11 || 206 || 151 || 357 || 98 || 79 || 1.4 || 0.5 || 9.8 || 7.2 || 17.0 || 4.7 || 3.8 || 0
|-
! scope="row" style="text-align:center" | 2012
|
| 13 || 8 || 8 || 6 || 66 || 41 || 107 || 35 || 28 || 1.0 || 0.8 || 8.3 || 5.1 || 13.4 || 4.4 || 3.5 || 0
|- style="background:#eaeaea;"
! scope="row" style="text-align:center" | 2013
|
| 13 || 5 || 4 || 4 || 52 || 35 || 87 || 22 || 9 || 0.8 || 0.8 || 10.4 || 7.0 || 17.4 || 4.4 || 1.8 || 0
|-
! scope="row" style="text-align:center" | 2014
|
| 13 || 13 || 8 || 10 || 141 || 64 || 205 || 56 || 49 || 0.6 || 0.8 || 10.8 || 4.9 || 15.8 || 4.3 || 3.8 || 0
|- style="background:#eaeaea;"
! scope="row" style="text-align:center" | 2015
|
| 13 || 15 || 9 || 12 || 156 || 128 || 284 || 70 || 62 || 0.6 || 0.8 || 10.4 || 8.5 || 18.9 || 4.7 || 4.1 || 0
|- class="sortbottom"
! colspan=3| Career
! 228
! 259
! 178
! 2112
! 1220
! 3332
! 953
! 702
! 1.1
! 0.8
! 9.3
! 5.4
! 14.6
! 4.2
! 3.1
! 10
|}

References

External links

 
 

Australian rules footballers from New South Wales
Sydney Swans players
Sydney Swans Premiership players
St Kilda Football Club players
1984 births
Living people
Australian people of German descent
NSW/ACT Rams players
Sandringham Football Club players
Australia international rules football team players
One-time VFL/AFL Premiership players